Waisale Vatubua is a Fijian rugby union and rugby league footballer who represented Fiji in rugby league at the 1995 World Cup.

In 1988 he played two rugby union test matches for Fiji (RU).

References

Living people
Fijian rugby league players
Fiji national rugby league team players
Dual-code rugby internationals
Fijian rugby union players
Rugby union wings
Fiji international rugby union players
I-Taukei Fijian people
Year of birth missing (living people)